Academy of the Sacred Heart is a Roman Catholic school located in Bloomfield Township, Michigan in Metro Detroit, near Bloomfield Hills.

It is the oldest independent school in Michigan. Founded in 1851 in Detroit, the Academy moved to its  campus in Bloomfield Township in 1958. It is a Catholic, college-preparatory school for young women from infancy through Grade 12 and for boys from infancy through Grade 8 of many cultures and faiths. The Academy is a member of the Network of Sacred Heart Schools, which includes 24 schools in the U.S.-Canada and an affiliation with the Society of the Sacred Heart in 41 countries around the world.

Background

Academy of the Sacred Heart was established by St. Madeleine Sophie Barat in 1851 in Detroit.  The school moved to Bloomfield Township in 1958.

In 1821 Father Gabriel Richard, a missionary in Detroit visited Mother Rose Philippine Duchesne in Florissant, Missouri.  Father Richard asked Mother Duchesne to establish a group in Detroit. This initial request was denied.  Father Richard's wish was not realized until 1848 when Madame Monique Beaubien wrote to Mother Hardy, Superior Provincial of the Society in New York, offering the Society of the Sacred Heart a piece of Beaubien property on Jefferson Avenue for an academy school, on the condition that orphans would also be educated at the institution.  On the southwest corner of Jefferson Avenue and St. Antoine Street a building was erected in 1861 at a cost exceeding $30,000.  The building was built to accommodate 150 students and for 50 years this was the school.

In 1918 the cornerstone from Jefferson Avenue was placed in its new location as a school was built on Lawrence Avenue.  By the 1950s the population shifted northward and the relocation of the school was considered.  Reverend Mother Katherine Wansboro bought  in Bloomfield Township.  The groundbreaking ceremonies were held in July 1957.  The cornerstone, first blessed in 1861 at the original foundation on Jefferson Avenue, then moved to Lawrence Avenue, was now set in place in Bloomfield Township.  The cornerstone was newly inscribed with “Built on Confidence in the Heart of Jesus.”  The actual move into the new building took place on July 15, 1958.

Kensington Academy
Kensington Academy was a boy's elementary and middle school of the Roman Catholic Archdiocese of Detroit. The school opened on the campus of the Academy of the Sacred Heart in Bloomfield Township in 1969. It moved into its own campus in 1982.

It initially occupied a campus in Bloomfield Township, but toward the end of its life its facility was in Beverly Hills.

In 2006 the school announced that it was merging with the Academy of the Sacred Heart. The current Academy of the Sacred Heart's middle school for boys, "Kensington Hall," is named after the former Kensington Academy. "Kensington Hall" was founded in 2002.

International Academy's Okma Campus occupies the former Kensington Academy campus in Bloomfield Township. The Japanese School of Detroit, a supplementary Japanese school serving Japanese nationals and Japanese Americans, previously had its school office at Kensington Academy.

Notes and references

External links
 School Website
 Admissions Info
 Kensington Academy (Archive: content begins in 2003)

Roman Catholic Archdiocese of Detroit
Catholic secondary schools in Michigan
Educational institutions established in 1851
Private K-12 schools in Michigan
Catholic elementary schools in Michigan
High schools in Oakland County, Michigan
1851 establishments in Michigan
Schools in Bloomfield Township, Oakland County, Michigan
Girls' schools in Michigan
Sacred Heart schools in the United States